The 1968 San Francisco Giants season was the Giants' 86th year in Major League Baseball, their 11th year in San Francisco since their move from New York following the 1957 season, and their ninth at Candlestick Park. The team finished in second place in the National League with an 88–74 record, 9 games behind the St. Louis Cardinals. The Giants' opponents scored 529 runs against them, the fewest in franchise history for a 162-game season. The Giants shut out the opposition 20 times, a record for the club's era in San Francisco.

Offseason 
 January 27, 1968: 1968 Major League Baseball draft
Garry Maddox was drafted by the Giants in the 2nd round.
George Foster was drafted by the Giants in the 3rd round.
 February 13, 1968: Tom Haller and Frank Kasheta (minors) were traded by the Giants to the Los Angeles Dodgers for Ron Hunt and Nate Oliver.

Regular season

Season standings

Record vs. opponents

Opening Day starters 
Jesús Alou
Jim Davenport
Jim Ray Hart
Jack Hiatt
Ron Hunt
Hal Lanier
Juan Marichal
Willie Mays
Willie McCovey

Notable transactions 
 June 7, 1968: Jim Howarth was drafted by the Giants in the 8th round of the 1968 Major League Baseball draft.

Roster

Player stats

Batting

Starters by position 
Note: Pos = Position; G = Games played; AB = At bats; H = Hits; Avg. = Batting average; HR = Home runs; RBI = Runs batted in

Other batters 
Note: G = Games played; AB = At bats; H = Hits; Avg. = Batting average; HR = Home runs; RBI = Runs batted in

Pitching

Starting pitchers 
Note: G = Games pitched; IP = Innings pitched; W = Wins; L = Losses; ERA = Earned run average; SO = Strikeouts

Other pitchers 
Note: G = Games pitched; IP = Innings pitched; W = Wins; L = Losses; ERA = Earned run average; SO = Strikeouts

Relief pitchers 
Note: G = Games pitched; W = Wins; L = Losses; SV = Saves; ERA = Earned run average; SO = Strikeouts

Awards and honors 

All-Star Game

Farm system 

LEAGUE CHAMPIONS: Fresno

References

External links
 1968 San Francisco Giants at Baseball Reference
 1968 San Francisco Giants at Baseball Almanac

San Francisco Giants seasons
San Francisco Giants season
San Fran